Hard Wax is a record shop located in the Kreuzberg borough of Berlin, Germany. It was founded in December 1989 by Mark Ernestus at the ground floor of a Reichenberger Straße’s building. It is specialized in techno music, reggae, dub and dubstep. Hard Wax also serves as a distributor for several Berlin-based record labels linked to the Basic Channel aesthetic. Some members (or former members) of its staff are prominent DJs like DJ Hell, Gernot Bronsert of Modeselektor,  Marcel Dettmann, DJ Rok, Gabriele „Mo“ Loschelder or Electric Indigo (Susanne Kirchmayr) who was in charge of sales from 1993 to 1996. The shop sets place a mail order system through its website (which represented 50% of the sales in 2009).

In 1996 Hard Wax moved to the third floor of an old factory in Paul-Lincke-Ufer 44a sharing its premises with the Basic Channel record label and the Dubplates and Mastering studio. It’s one of the oldest record stores in electronic music in Berlin. Playing the role of an important hub for the techno community in the world, the shop helped extensively the development of this burgeoning scene in the 90s. Furthermore, as with Tresor club in Berlin, it shares a privileged relationship with the musicians of Detroit techno in the so-called "Berlin-Detroit axis".

External links 

 Killasan and Hard Wax

Music in Berlin
1989 establishments in Germany
Techno
Dub music
Reggae culture
Dubstep